Sir Sidney Solomon Abrahams  (11 February 1885 – 14 May 1957), nicknamed Solly, was a British Olympic athlete and 26th Chief Justice of Ceylon (Sri Lanka). He was the older brother of famed Olympian Harold Abrahams.

Early life
Born in Birmingham, England, Abrahams was educated at Bedford Modern School and Emmanuel College, Cambridge.

He competed at athletics for Cambridge University from 1904 to 1906. At the unofficial Olympiad, the 1906 'Intercalated Games' held in Athens, he finished fifth in the long jump with 6.21 metres. At the 1912 Stockholm Olympics he finished in eleventh place in the same event with 6.72 metres. At the 1913 Amateur Athletic Association Championships in London, he won the long jump with 6.86 metres.British Athletics Championships 1876-1914.

He studied law at the Middle Temple and was called to the bar in 1909.

Career
He joined the Colonial Service and was Advocate General in Baghdad in 1920 and President of the Civil Courts in Basra in 1921. After serving as Attorney General of Zanzibar (1922), Uganda (1925) and Gold Coast (1928), Abrahams was appointed Chief Justice of Uganda in 1933 and Chief Justice of Tanganyika in 1934.

He then served as Chief Justice of Ceylon from 1936 to 1939 and was knighted in 1936. The most celebrated case he presided over was that of the Australian Mark Anthony Bracegirdle, whom the Governor of British Ceylon Sir Reginald Stubbs was attempting to have deported; the court ruled against the Governor. He was founder-president of the Medico-Legal Society of Ceylon. He was succeeded by John Curtois Howard, after the acting Francis Soertsz. He retired from the bench in 1939.

Sidney Abrahams chaired a Committee on the Administration of Justice in Nigeria. He was later Senior Legal Assistant to the Commonwealth Relations Office, and played a major role in the suspension of the People's Progressive Party Government of Cheddi Jagan in British Guiana (Guyana) in 1953.

He was elected president of the London Athletic Club. Abrahams was the first Jew to hold the post.

Abrahams was married to Ruth Bowman and they had two children, Valerie and Anthony Abrahams.

See also
List of select Jewish track and field athletes

References

External links
T. Perera, 'The Bracegirdle Saga: 60 Years After', What Next, No 5 1997
Abrahams, Sidney 'Solly', Jews in Sport Online
American Involvement in Guyana in 1953, History of Guyana

1885 births
1957 deaths
People from Birmingham, West Midlands
People educated at Bedford Modern School
Alumni of Emmanuel College, Cambridge
Members of the Middle Temple
English male long jumpers
Jewish male athletes (track and field)
Olympic athletes of Great Britain
Athletes (track and field) at the 1906 Intercalated Games
Athletes (track and field) at the 1912 Summer Olympics
English Jews
Chief Justices of British Ceylon
Chief justices of Tanzania
People from British Ceylon
19th-century British people
Knights Bachelor
Sportspeople from Birmingham, West Midlands
Uganda Protectorate judges
Gold Coast (British colony) people
Tanganyika (territory) judges
Attorneys General of the Gold Coast (British colony)
Attorneys General of the Uganda Protectorate
Attorneys-General of the Sultanate of Zanzibar
Members of the Privy Council of the United Kingdom
English people of Polish-Jewish descent
English people of Welsh descent
Civil servants in the Commonwealth Relations Office